The flag of NATO (North Atlantic Treaty Organization) consists of a dark blue field charged with a white compass rose emblem, with four white lines radiating from the four cardinal directions. Adopted three years after the creation of NATO, it has been the flag of NATO since October 14, 1953. The blue color symbolizes the Atlantic Ocean, while the circle stands for unity.

History

The North Atlantic Treaty Organization was established on April 4, 1949, when twelve nations signed the North Atlantic Treaty to counteract the perceived threat from the Soviet Union. 
The first flag used by NATO was unveiled October 5, 1951, by Gen. Dwight Eisenhower, who helped design it. The 1951 flag consisted of a green field with the coat of arms of the Supreme Headquarters Allied Powers Europe (SHAPE), which still uses the flag. 
NATO began looking for an emblem to differentiate it from SHAPE, a task handled by the newly formed Information Policy Working Group. After several discussions, it concluded that a flag for the organization containing its emblem was necessary, and that it would recommend this to the North Atlantic Council.
The council stipulated that the design had to be "simple and striking," in addition to highlighting the "peaceful purpose" of the Treaty; several proposals were rejected. An emblem of NATO was finally adopted on October 14, 1953.  The decision was announced by Hastings Ismay, 1st Baron Ismay – the first Secretary General of NATO – exactly two weeks later on October 28, where he also elaborated on the symbolism behind the chosen design. He described the flag as "simple and inoffensive."  However, the flag was not universally well-received, and attracted criticism from for instance US Congressman John Travers Wood, who condemned the flag as a "strange and alien rag."  He made the remarks in light of an alleged incident where the flag of the United States was reportedly replaced by the NATO flag in Norfolk, Virginia, the headquarters of the Supreme Allied Commander Atlantic.

The modern flag was first hoisted on November 9, 1953, at the opening ceremony of the Atlantic Exhibition in Paris.  However, little is known about the occasion, since no documentation of the speech delivered at the event exists.

Symbolism
The colors of the flag carry cultural, political, and regional meanings. The dark blue field represents the Atlantic Ocean, while the circle stands for unity among the member states of NATO.  The compass rose symbolizes the direction towards the path of peace, the goal that member states strive for; it has been updated once.

Sculpture "NATO Star" 

When the North Atlantic Council decided in late 1969 to make the Brussels NATO site a permanent home, the question was raised of lending a prestigious note to the empty courtyard of the main entrance. Consultant architects were invited to come up with a solution to embellish the forecourt, known as the Cour d’Honneur. Following a suggestion made by the Greek representative, Belgian architect Raymond Huyberechts designed a motif inspired by the NATO logo: a stylised “rose des vents” cut by two circles representing the old and new continent. It would be made of  factory-oxidised steel whose red-brown tint would not be affected by atmospheric agents.  The Council expressed their preference for this motif when the model was presented at a meeting held on 17 March 1970. The sculpture is affectionately known as the “NATO star”. The NATO star is 7 metres high, between 4.2 and 7 metres wide.

Originally budgeted at 1.5 million Belgian francs, the sculpture was erected in mid-August 1971 and an opening reception took place on 10 September 1971. On 1 October 1971, Joseph Luns became the first NATO Secretary General to have his photo taken with the star. As part of the move to NATO’s new headquarters, the star moved across Boulevard Leopold III to its new home on Saturday 28 May 2016. The star is surrounded by the flags of the NATO member countries.

See also
 "The NATO Hymn"
 Flag of Europe
 Flag of the Western Union

References

External links

 

NATO
Flag
Flags introduced in 1953